David Roddy is an American retired police officer who served as chief of the Chattanooga Police Department.

Early life and education 
Roddy was born and raised in Chattanooga, Tennessee. He graduated from Tyler High School. Roddy completed a B.S. at Middle Tennessee State University.

Career 
Roddy began his career at the Chattanooga Police Department (CPD)  as a patrol officer. He later served as captain of different divisions such as uniformed services and internal affairs.

Chief Fred Fletcher selected Roddy as chief of staff in 2014. Roddy served as acting chief when Fletcher was out of the office on personal leave.

Roddy was nominated as chief of the CPD by mayor Andy Berke and confirmed by the Chattanooga City Council on August 22, 2017. In his first year as chief, Roddy grew the department and built on existing policies and practices. In an effort to boost morale, Roddy changed the department's beard policy.

Roddy's tweet on May 27, 2020, condemning the murder of George Floyd brought praise and scrutiny. On May 30, he visited with peaceful protesters in downtown Chattanooga to answer their questions or concerns.

Roddy retired on July 30, 2021.

Personal life 
He is an outdoorsman and enjoys hunting and hiking. He is married to Shannon. They have two daughters.

References 

American municipal police chiefs
People from Chattanooga, Tennessee
Living people
Year of birth missing (living people)
20th-century births
Middle Tennessee State University alumni